"Medicine Jar" is a song by English alternative rock band Queenadreena, released as their final single from their third studio album, The Butcher and the Butterfly (2005). It was released both on compact disc and as a limited edition pink 7" vinyl record.

Track listing

Personnel 
Queenadreena
 KatieJane Garsidevocals
 Crispin Grayguitar
 Melanie Garsidebass
 Pete Howarddrums

Technical personnel
Paul Corkettproduction
Simon Daveymastering

References

2005 singles
Queenadreena songs
One Little Indian Records singles
2005 songs